This chronological list of managers of Yeovil Town Football Club comprises all those who have held the position of manager of the first team of Yeovil Town since the club was first admitted to the Southern League in 1923 and subsequently turned professional. Each manager's entry includes his dates of tenure and the club's overall competitive record (in terms of matches won, drawn and lost), honours won and significant achievements while under his care. Caretaker managers are included, where known, as well as those who have been in permanent charge.

Managers
All first-team matches in national competitions are counted. Manager dates and statistics are sourced from Miller, Kerry (2005) for pre-Second World War managers, and then Ciderspace up until promotion to the Football League in 2003 and Soccerbase thereafter. Statistics are complete up to and including 28 October 2022. Names of caretaker managers are supplied where known, and periods of caretaker-management are highlighted in italics. Wins, losses and draws are results at the final whistle; the results of penalty shoot-outs are not counted.

Key
* Served as caretaker manager.
† Served as caretaker manager before being appointed permanently.

Records

Nationalities
As of 28 October 2022 (including caretakers)
  English (35)
  Scottish (8)
  Welsh (2)

Most games
Updated 4 February 2015
  Gary Johnson : 383 games.
  Brian Hall : 257 games.
  David Pratt : 214 games.
  Ike Clarke : 204 games.
  Jack Gregory : 202 games.

References
General
Post-Second World War Statistics Archive at Ciderspace Independent Fan's Website.
Yeovil Town managerial history at Soccerbase.
Yeovil Town at Statto.

External links
Yeovil Town F.C. official website

Managers
 
Yeovil Town